Pescatoria is a genus of flowering plants from the orchid family, Orchidaceae. It is native to Costa Rica, Panama, and northern South America.

Species
The following species and nothospecies are accepted as of May 2014:

Pescatoria backhousiana Rchb.f. - Ecuador
Pescatoria × bella Rchb.f. - Colombia  (P. coelestis × P. klabochorum)
Pescatoria cerina (Lindl. & Paxton) Rchb.f. - Costa Rica, Panama
Pescatoria cochlearis Rolfe   - Ecuador
Pescatoria coelestis (Rchb.f.) Dressler - Colombia
Pescatoria coronaria Rchb.f. - Colombia
Pescatoria dayana Rchb.f. - Colombia, Ecuador
Pescatoria dormaniana Rchb.f. - Colombia
Pescatoria ecuadorana (Dodson) Dressler - Ecuador
Pescatoria fimbriata Regel  - Colombia
Pescatoria × gairiana Rchb.f.  - Ecuador  (P. klabochorum × P. lawrenceana)
Pescatoria hemixantha (Rchb.f.) Dressler - Roraima, Guyana, Venezuela, possibly Suriname
Pescatoria hirtzii (Waldv.) Dressler - Colombia, Ecuador, Peru
Pescatoria klabochorum Rchb.f. - Ecuador
Pescatoria lalindei (Rchb.f.) Dressler ex P.A.Harding - Colombia
Pescatoria lamellosa Rchb.f.  - Colombia
Pescatoria lawrenceana (Rchb.f.) Dressler - Colombia, Ecuador
Pescatoria lehmannii Rchb.f.  - Ecuador
Pescatoria × pallens (Rchb.f.) P.A.Harding - Colombia 
Pescatoria pulvinaris (Rchb.f.) Dressler - Colombia 
Pescatoria russeliana Rchb.f. - Colombia 
Pescatoria schroederiana (Sander) Rolfe - Colombia 
Pescatoria triumphans Rchb.f. & Warsz. - Colombia 
Pescatoria violacea (Lindl.) Dressler - Venezuela, Guyana, Suriname, French Guiana, northern Brazil 
Pescatoria wallisii Linden & Rchb.f. - Ecuador
Pescatoria whitei (Rolfe) Dressler - Colombia

See also 
 List of Orchidaceae genera

References 

  (2009) Epidendroideae (Part two). Genera Orchidacearum 5: 521 ff. Oxford University Press.
  2005. Handbuch der Orchideen-Namen. Dictionary of Orchid Names. Dizionario dei nomi delle orchidee. Ulmer, Stuttgart

External links 

Zygopetalinae
Zygopetalinae genera
Orchids of Central America
Orchids of South America